Jung-woo is a Korean unisex given name.

Hanja
Its meaning differs based on the hanja used to write each syllable of the name. There are 75 hanja with the reading "jung" and 41 hanja with the reading "woo" on the South Korean government's official list of hanja which may be used in given names. Ways of writing this name in hanja include:

 (바를 정 bareul jeong, 벗 우 beot u): "upright friend". The same characters are also used to write the Japanese given name Masatomo.
 (바를 정 bareul jeong, 집 우 jip u): "upright house". The same characters are also used to write the Japanese given name Masataka.

People
People with this name include:
Choi Jung-woo (born 1957), South Korean actor
Park Jung-woo (born 1969), South Korean film director and screenwriter
Ha Jung-woo (born Kim Sung-hoon, 1979), South Korean actor
Lim Jung-woo (born 1978), South Korean field hockey player
Jung Woo (born Kim Jung-guk, 1981), South Korean actor
Kim Jung-woo (born 1982), South Korean football player
Seo Jeong-wu (1989–2010), one of two South Korean marines killed in the North Korean bombardment of Yeonpyeong
Kim Jung-woo (singer) (born 1990), South Korean singer

Fictional characters with this name include:
Han Jeong-woo, in 2004 South Korean television series April Kiss
Seo Jung-woo, in 2005 South Korean television series My Girl
Lee Jung-woo, in 2010 South Korean television series Athena: Goddess of War 
Han Jung-woo, in 2012 South Korean television series Missing You
Do Jung-woo, in 2015 South Korean television series Angry Mom

See also
List of Korean given names

References

Korean unisex given names